Jarrett George Grube (born November 5, 1981) is an American professional baseball pitcher who is currently a free agent. He has played in Major League Baseball (MLB) the Los Angeles Angels of Anaheim.

Career
Grube attended DeKalb High School and played college baseball for the University of Memphis.

Colorado Rockies
He was drafted in the 10th round of the 2004 MLB draft by the Colorado Rockies. He began his minor league career as a starter but then was shifted to the bullpen in 2006. He pitched for the Rockies minor league system until his release in 2009.

Southern Maryland Blue Crabs
He signed with the Southern Maryland Blue Crabs for the remainder of the 2009 season. He continued to pitch for the Blue Crabs in 2010.

Seattle Mariners
In 2011, he signed a minor league deal with the Seattle Mariners.

Los Angeles Angels of Anaheim
He was then acquired by the Los Angeles Angels of Anaheim in 2012.

He was called up to MLB for the first time on May 31, 2014. Grube made his MLB debut that day, pitching  of an inning against the Oakland Athletics, and allowing a home run. He was returned to the minors after the game to make room on the roster for Josh Hamilton. He would not appear in another Major League game in his career which would consist of just seven pitches.

Cleveland Indians
Grube signed a minor league deal with the Cleveland Indians on June 21, 2015. He elected free agency on November 6, 2015. He signed another minor league contract with the Indians on December 18, 2015, and was released on June 8, 2016.

Seattle Mariners
Grube signed a minor league contract with Seattle Mariners on June 9, 2016, and was assigned to Triple-A Tacoma Rainiers. He was called up to the Major League club briefly on August 10, 2016 and returned to the minors on August 11. He became a free agent at the end of the season.

Toronto Blue Jays
On November 28, 2016, he signed a minor league contract that included an invitation to spring training with the Toronto Blue Jays. On June 18, 2017, Grube was traded to the Cleveland Indians organization for cash considerations. He elected free agency on November 6, 2017.

References

External links

Venezuelan Professional Baseball League

1981 births
Living people
American expatriate baseball players in Mexico
Arkansas Travelers players
Asheville Tourists players
Baseball players from Fort Wayne, Indiana
Cardenales de Lara players
Colorado Springs Sky Sox players
Columbus Clippers players
Jackson Generals (Southern League) players
Leones del Caracas players
American expatriate baseball players in Venezuela
Leones del Escogido players
American expatriate baseball players in the Dominican Republic
Los Angeles Angels players
Major League Baseball pitchers
Memphis Tigers baseball players
Mexican League baseball pitchers
Modesto Nuts players
Peoria Javelinas players
Salt Lake Bees players
Southern Maryland Blue Crabs players
Tacoma Rainiers players
Tigres de Quintana Roo players
Tri-City Dust Devils players
Tulsa Drillers players
United States national baseball team players
West Tennessee Diamond Jaxx players